The following outline is provided as an overview of and topical guide to domestic violence:

Domestic violence – pattern of abusive behaviors by one or both partners in an intimate relationship, such as marriage, dating, family, or cohabitation. It is also known as domestic abuse, spousal abuse, battering, family violence, and intimate partner violence (IPV).

What type of thing is domestic violence? 

Domestic violence can be described as all of the following:

 Violence – use of physical force to apply a state to others contrary to their wishes and may include some combination of verbal, emotional, economic, physical and sexual abuse.
 Coercive Control – Braiker identified the following ways that manipulators control their victims:
 Positive reinforcement: praise, superficial charm, superficial sympathy (crocodile tears), excessive apologizing; money, approval, gifts; attention, facial expressions such as a forced laugh or smile; public recognition.
 Negative reinforcement: removing one from a negative situation as a reward. For example: "You won't have to walk home if you allow me to do this to you."
 Intermittent or partial reinforcement: partial or intermittent negative reinforcement can create an effective climate of fear and doubt. Partial or intermittent positive reinforcement can encourage the victim to persist.
 Punishment: berating, yelling, refusing to speak to partner, intimidation, threats, swearing, emotional blackmail, the guilt trap, sulking, crying, and playing the victim.
 Traumatic one-trial learning: verbal abuse, explosive anger, or other intimidating behavior to establish dominance or superiority; even one incident of such behavior can condition or train victims to avoid upsetting, confronting or contradicting the manipulator.
 Oppression – exercise of authority or power in a burdensome, cruel, or unjust manner. It can also be defined as an act or instance of oppressing, the state of being oppressed, and the feeling of being heavily burdened, mentally or physically, by troubles, adverse conditions, and anxiety. Abusers usually humiliate and brainwash the victim verbally, in which the victims may find themselves devalued with emotional distress. The intention is to exploit and dominate in depriving the victim of their most basic rights and needs.
Extreme criticism constantly - This is one of the most serious emotional abuse issues. Abusers will use many brainwashing techniques to make the victims question themselves upon their guilt – this may lead to the victims suffering from Post-traumatic stress disorder. Abusers often like to criticise the victims either directly or indirectly. The intention of such an act is to make the victim lose their confidence and doubt their abilities so that they look to their abuser to give them the validation they need. Abusers may also leave the victims isolated from their family and friends and many of them resulted in mental distress like feeling ashamed, terrified and hurt.

Prevalence 
Epidemiology of domestic violence – Domestic violence occurs across the world, in various cultures, and affects people across society, irrespective of economic status or gender.

Forms 

The following table includes the forms of violence typically defined as part of Intimate partner violence, which is domestic violence in an intimate relationship by one's spouse or lover. It also includes a column for other family members or partners.

The rate of occurrence varies considerably based upon one's country, socio-economic class, culture, religion, family history and other factors.

Victims

Domestic violence affects people across society, irrespective of age, gender, sexual orientation, culture, religion or socio-economic status. Stop Abuse For Everyone (SAFE), a United States domestic violence organization, advocates for an "inclusive" model of domestic violence, focusing on groups that are "lacking in services", such as abused men, gay, lesbian, intersex, and transgender victims, and the elderly.

Women
Some forms of domestic violence are unique to women victims:
 Bride-buying
 Domestic violence and pregnancy
 Domestic violence in lesbian relationships
 Misogyny, the hate and contempt of women and girls

Men
Male victims of domestic abuse:
 Domestic violence against men
 Misandry, the hate and contempt of men and boys

A large study, compiled by Martin S. Fiebert, shows that women are as likely to be abusive to men, but the men are less likely to be hurt. However, he noted, men are seriously injured in 38% of the cases in which "extreme aggression" is used. Fiebert additionally noted that his work was not meant to minimize the serious effects of men who abuse women. Women are far more likely to use weapons, such as throwing a plate or firing a gun. The National Institute of Justice (NIJ) contends that a national survey, supported by NIJ, the Centers for Disease Control and Prevention, and the Bureau of Justice Statistics that examined more serious assaults, does not support the conclusion of similar rates of male and female spousal assaults. This survey was conducted within a safety or crime context and found more partner abuse by men against women. A study published in the Violence & Victims Journal Vol. 1 concluded that a feminist analysis of Domestic Abuse was necessary to combat common misconceptions. The study found that 92% of women who used violence against their male partners were in self-defense, and that violence reciprocated by victims may be an integral part of abuse victimology.

LGBT
Abuse in same-sex relationships is under-researched area of domestic violence, with a very wide range of prevalence estimates, and with fewer resources available for shelter and counseling.
 Domestic violence in same-sex relationships
 Domestic violence in lesbian relationships

Children
Within a family, children may be victims of domestic child abuse in various ways:
 Parental bullying of children, where a parent is overly aggressive towards his or her child
 Narcissistic parent, where the child is considered to exist to fulfill the parent's wishes and needs
 Sibling abuse, where one sibling is abusive towards another sibling

A child may be affected by domestic violence even when the child is not the direct target:
 Effects of domestic violence on children

Parents and the elderly
Domestic violence can also be perpetrated by children against their parents:
 Parental abuse by children, also known as child-to-parent violence
 Elder abuse, domestic violence against older people

Research concepts

Measurement instruments
 Conflict tactics scale – research method for identifying intimate partner violence by measuring the conflict tactic behaviors.

Theoretical constructs
 Cycle of abuse – social cycle theory to explain patterns of behavior of a violent intimate relationship: Tension building phase, acting-out phase, reconciliation / honeymoon phase, and calm phase, which leads back to the tension building phase.
 Cycle of violence
 Within a relationship – repeated acts of violence as a cyclical pattern, associated with high emotions and doctrines of retribution or revenge. The pattern, or cycle, repeats and can happen many times during a relationship. Each phase may last a different length of time and over time the level of violence may increase.
 Intergenerational cycle of violence – violence that is passed from father to son or daughter, parent to child, or sibling to sibling.
 Misandry – the hatred or dislike of men or boys, which manifests like Misogyny.
 Misogyny – the hatred or dislike of women or girls, may be manifested in varying degrees of intensity, like teaching girls or women to feel self-contempt or violence.
 Relational disorder – dysfunction within a relationship, versus being specific to a specific individual's dysfunction.

Partner dynamics
 Situational couple violence – arises infrequently out of conflicts that escalate to arguments and then to violence, rather than a general pattern of control. It is likely the most common type of intimate partner violence. Women are "almost as likely" as men to be abusers, however, women are more likely to be physically injured, require police intervention and become fearful of their mates.
 Intimate terrorism (IT) – pattern of ongoing control using emotional, physical and other forms of domestic violence. It is what was traditionally the definition of domestic violence depicted in the "Power and Control Wheel" which illustrates the different and inter-related forms of abuse.
 Violent resistance (VR), or "self-defense" – violence perpetrated by victims against their abusive partners. It is generally used infrequently because, men are often better able to physically overpower women.
 Common couple violence (CCV) – domestic violence "in which conflict occasionally gets ‘out of hand,’ leading usually to ‘minor’ forms of violence, and rarely escalates into serious or life-threatening forms of violence."
 Mutual violent control (MVC) – rare type of intimate partner violence that occurs when both partners act in a violent manner, battling for control.

Impacts
The incidence of abuse may result in the following:
 Effects of domestic violence on children – dysfunctions in the physical, behavioral, emotional, and social areas of life which affect their well-being, child development, teen dating experiences, future domestic situations and mortality.
 Mental illness – psychological or behavioral pattern generally associated with subjective distress or disability that occurs in an individual, and which is not a part of normal development or culture. Such a disorder may consist of a combination of affective, behavioral, cognitive and perceptual components.
 Battered person syndrome – physical and psychological condition victims of domestic abuse, which may be manifested as a type of Post-traumatic stress disorder (PTSD), from an ongoing Cycle of abuse.
 Self-harm – intentional, direct injuring of body tissue most often done without suicidal intentions.
 Suicide, – act of intentionally causing one's own death. Suicide is often committed out of despair or attributed to some underlying mental disorder, such as depression, bipolar disorder, schizophrenia, alcoholism, or drug abuse.
 Self-immolation – setting oneself on fire, often as a form of protest or for the purposes of martyrdom or suicide.

Legal

 Domestic violence court – specialized courts designed to improve victim safety and enhance defendant accountability, created in response to frustration among victim advocates, judges and attorneys who saw the same litigants cycling through the justice system repeatedly.
 Evidence-based prosecution of domestic violence – prosecutors aggressively trying domestic violence cases, basing their cases on evidence rather than victim cooperation, resulting in higher conviction rates.
 Injunction – equitable remedy in the form of a court order that requires a party to do or refrain from doing certain acts. A party that fails to comply with an injunction faces criminal or civil penalties and may have to pay damages or accept sanctions. In some cases, breaches of injunctions are considered serious criminal offenses that merit arrest and possible prison sentences.
 Restraining order – requires a party to do, or to refrain from doing, certain acts. A party that refuses to comply with an order faces criminal or civil penalties and may have to pay damages or accept sanctions. Breaches of restraining orders can be considered serious criminal offences that merit arrest and possible prison sentences. The term is most commonly used in reference to domestic violence, harassment, stalking or sexual assault.
 Battered woman defense – a self-defense measure used in court that the person accused of an assault / murder was suffering from battered person syndrome.

Religion and domestic violence 
 Religion and domestic violence
 Christianity and domestic violence
 Islam and domestic violence
 Peaceful Families Project – Muslim organization

Domestic violence by region 

 Domestic violence in Afghanistan
 Family Response Unit – office of the Afghan National Police which deals with domestic violence, female and child victims of crime, and female suspects. The unit is staffed by policewomen trained by the United Nations Assistance Mission in Afghanistan (UNAMA).
 Domestic violence in Argentina
 Domestic violence against women in Argentina
 Domestic violence in Armenia
 Domestic violence in Australia
 Act as 1 Campaign – Domestic Violence and Family Violence Prevention campaign  led by the Queensland Government.
 Humbug (Aboriginal) – forms of begging and domestic violence in rural and remote Aboriginal communities in the Northern Territory, Australia.
 Domestic violence in Bolivia
 Domestic violence in Brazil
 Human rights in Brazil and domestic violence
 Lei Maria da Penha – Brazil's federal law against domestic violence
 Domestic violence in Chile
 Domestic violence in Colombia
 Lissette Ochoa domestic violence case – one of the best known cases of spousal abuse in Colombia because of the couple's elite social status and for the brutality of the battering perpetrated on Lissette Ochoa by her husband Rafael Dangond.
 Domestic violence in Ecuador
 Domestic violence in Guyana
 Domestic violence in India
 Bell Bajao – campaign of the Breakthrough (human rights) organization
 Protection of Women from Domestic Violence Act 2005 – India federal law
 Save Indian Family (India) – men's rights movement that asserts misuse of India's laws related to dowry harassment and domestic violence and provides moral and legal support for men and their families who have suffered or have been accused of intimate partner violence.
 Domestic violence in Iran
 Domestic violence in Malaysia
 Women's Aid Organisation – non-governmental organization that fights for women's rights and specifically against violence against women.
 Domestic violence in Norway
 Domestic violence in Panama
 Domestic violence in Paraguay
 Domestic violence in Peru
 Domestic violence in Russia
 Domestic violence in Samoa
 Domestic violence in South Korea
 Korea Women's Hot Line – non-profit women's rights activist group, protecting women's rights from all kinds of violence and advancing women's social position as well as establishing gender equality in the spheres of family, work, and society.
 Domestic violence in Spain
 Shows red card to abuser – a public awareness campaign and symbol to say "no" to domestic violence
 Domestic violence in Tajikistan
 Domestic violence in Turkey
 Domestic violence in the United Kingdom
 Organizations
 Broken Rainbow (organisation) – deals with same sex domestic violence
 Campaign Against Domestic Violence – organization with multi-pronged approach towards eliminating domestic violence
 ManKind Initiative – domestic violence charity
 Refuge (United Kingdom charity) – charity for female victims
 Scottish Women's Aid – charity to prevent domestic violence against women and children
 Women's Aid Federation of England – United Kingdom charity to prevent domestic violence against women and children
 What's it going to take? – campaign of the WAFOE
Laws \ legal issues
 Domestic Violence, Crime and Victims Act 2004 –
 Domestic violence in the United States
Laws \ legal issues
 Address confidentiality program – some states in the United States
 Domestic Violence Offender Gun Ban – addresses Gun violence in the United States
 Violence Against Women Act – United States federal law
 Family Violence Prevention and Services Act –
 Organizations
 Futures Without Violence –
 Loveisrespect, National Teen Dating Abuse Helpline –
 National Coalition Against Domestic Violence –
 National Domestic Violence Hotline –
 National Network to End Domestic Violence –
 Tahirih Justice Center –

Prevention 
 Duluth model (United States) –
 Initiatives to prevent sexual violence (United States) –
 CVFR batterer intervention program (United States) – based on NVC and reported 0% recidivism
 Restorative Justice

Experts

Academics
Some of the major academic researchers on domestic violence are:
 Jacquelyn Campbell, domestic homicides, female victims
 Kenneth Dodge, aggressive behavior, violence in children
 Emily Douglas, child abuse and welfare, help seeking, public policy
 Mary Ellsberg, international studies, violence against women
 David Finkelhor, child sexual abuse
 Nicola Graham-Kevan, aggression, perpetrator treatment
 Denise Hines. prevention, dating violence, child abuse, male victims
 Linda Saltzman, epidemiology, surveillance, prevalence
 Murray Straus, prevalence, corporal punishment

Activists
Some of the most notable domestic violence activists are:
 Ruahine Albert, New Zealand, co-founded women's shelter, perpetrator treatment
 Angela Barker, Australia, dating violence victim, advocate
 Sarah Buel, USA, lawyer, victim advocate
 Elizabeth Celi, Australia, psychologist, male victims
 Anne Cools, Canada, senator, ran one of the first domestic violence shelters in Canada
 Donna Ferrato, USA, photojournalist documenting domestic violence
 Ellen Pence, USA, co-founded the Duluth Domestic Abuse Intervention Project
 Erin Pizzey, England, founded the world's first domestic violence shelter
 Deborah Tucker, USA, founded the first domestic violence shelter in the United States

International organizations and conventions

 United Nations
 United Nations Development Fund for Women
 United Nations Entity for Gender Equality and the Empowerment of Women (UN Women) 
 United Nations General Assembly
 Declaration on the Elimination of Violence Against Women (DEVAW)
 Convention on the Elimination of All Forms of Discrimination Against Women (CEDAW) 
 African Union
 Protocol to the African Charter on Human and Peoples’ Rights on the Rights of Women in Africa (Maputo Protocol)
 Council of Europe
 Convention on preventing and combating violence against women and domestic violence (Istanbul Convention)
 Organization of American States
 Inter-American Convention on the Prevention, Punishment, and Eradication of Violence against Women (Belém do Pará Convention)
 Islam-related organizations
 AHA Foundation – concerned with Muslim women's rights in Western countries
 Peaceful Families Project – (Islamic organization)

Domestic violence-related media

Periodicals 
 Contemporary Family Therapy – journal with articles about "the latest developments in theory, research and practice pertaining to family therapy, with an emphasis on examining families within their broader socio-economic and ethnic matrices."
 Family Process – non-profit journal with current articles about family system issues, focusing on research, policy, and applied practice.
 Family Relations – international journal, published on behalf of the National Council on Family Relations, regarding family studies.
 International Journal of Interdisciplinary Social Sciences
 Journal of Adult Protection
 Journal of Child and Family Studies
 Journal of Family Issues – peer-reviewed academic journal that publishes papers in the field of Family Studies.
 Journal of Family Psychology
 Journal of Family Violence
 Journal of Interdisciplinary Social Sciences
 Journal of Interpersonal Violence – publishes current "information on domestic violence, rape, child sexual abuse and other violent crimes."
 Journal of Marital and Family Therapy
 Journal of Marriage and the Family
 Signs: Journal of Women in Culture and Society – academic journal covering a wide range of disciplines covering issues like gender, race, culture, class, sexuality, and/or nation.
 Trauma, Violence, & Abuse – publishes original research for practitioners.
 Violence Against Women – peer-reviewed academic journal that publishes papers in the field of Women's studies.

Books, non-fictional
Mommie Dearest (1978), a memoir described the author's upbringing by an abusive alcoholic mother. 
Life with Billy (1986), describing a woman's life with her abusive husband.
The War on Women (2007), about domestic violence in Canada.

Books, fictional 
 Oliver Twist

Documentaries 
A Better Man (2017)
 The Conspiracy of Silence
 Defending Our Lives
 Power and Control: Domestic Violence in America
 Silent Voices
 Sin by Silence

Films

Gallery

See also 

 Abuse
 Dating violence
 Domestic violence (women's) shelter
 Gender studies
 Impact of the 2019–20 coronavirus pandemic on domestic violence
 Interpersonal relationships
 Men's rights
 Sociology of the family
 Victimization
 Violence

References 
Notes

Citations

External links 

 Presentation outline of The Faces of Domestic Violence, by Henry A. Doenlen, M.D.
 Domestic Abuse Training Outline For Health Care Providers, U.S. Department of Defense
NCDSV. National Center on Domestic and Sexual Violence...consulting, training and advocacy.
RAINN. Information about the rights of spouses and how to protect oneself from spousal abuse.
Stop Abuse For Everyone. Services for victims of domestic violence who typically fall between the cracks, such as abused men, gay and lesbian victims, the elderly, teens, and immigrants.
Domestic Violence Against Men In Colorado. Information and research about partner violence against men.

Domestic violence
Domestic violence

Crime